Robert Foulis may refer to:

Robert Foulis (printer) (1707–1776), Scottish printer and publisher
Robert Foulis (inventor) (1796–1866), Canadian inventor